Rafael Pedroza (born March 27, 1955) is a retired Panamanian boxer and was briefly a super-flyweight world champion in 1981.

Pedroza turned professional in 1974; he lost his first two attempts at a world title in 1977 and 1979 but became the WBA super-flyweight world champion on December 5, 1981 after his points victory against Argentine Gustavo Ballas. Pedroza was beaten in his first defense by Jiro Watanabe in what ended up being his final bout. He is a cousin of hall-of-fame boxer Eusebio Pedroza.

See also
List of super-flyweight boxing champions

External links

1955 births
Living people
Sportspeople from Colón, Panama
Panamanian male boxers
Afro-Panamanian
Light-flyweight boxers
Super-flyweight boxers
World super-flyweight boxing champions
World Boxing Association champions